Sukhaya is a rural locality (a selo) in Barguzinsky District, Republic of Buryatia, Russia. The population was 12 as of 2010. There are 14 streets.

Geography 
Sukhaya is located 21 km northeast of Barguzin (the district's administrative centre) by road. Ulyun is the nearest rural locality.

References 

Rural localities in Barguzinsky District